Edward Adolph Aumann (29 December 1897 – 13 August 1982) was an Australian rules footballer who played with Richmond in the Victorian Football League (VFL). He later served on the Eastern Districts League Tribunal and also served as President of the Nunawading Football Club.

Notes

External links 

1897 births
1982 deaths
Australian rules footballers from Melbourne
Richmond Football Club players
People from Doncaster, Victoria